Mohammad Wasim Wazir (Urdu, ; born 25 August 2001) also known as Wasim Jr. is a Pakistani cricketer. He plays for Islamabad United in Pakistan Super League.

Early life
He was born into a Pashtun family in North Waziristan, Khyber Pakhtunkhwa, where he began to play tape-ball cricket. Due to the lack of facilities there, he had to move to the provincial capital of Peshawar where he joined a cricket club before playing at district-level and then at regional-level, finally representing the Pakistan U19 team.

Career
Wasim was part of Pakistan's squad for the 2020 Under-19 Cricket World Cup. He later made his first-class debut on 26 November 2020, for Khyber Pakhtunkhwa, in the 2020–21 Quaid-e-Azam Trophy. In January 2021, he was named in Khyber Pakhtunkhwa's squad for the 2020–21 Pakistan Cup. He made his List A debut on 18 January 2021, for Khyber Pakhtunkhwa, in the 2020–21 Pakistan Cup. He made his Twenty20 debut on 21 February 2021, for Islamabad United in the 2021 Pakistan Super League.

In March 2021, he was named in Pakistan's limited overs squads for their tours to South Africa and Zimbabwe. In June 2021, he was also named in Pakistan's Twenty20 International (T20I) squad for the series against the West Indies. He made his T20I debut on 28 July 2021, for Pakistan against the West Indies, taking the wicket of Chris Gayle.

In September 2021, he was named in Pakistan's One Day International (ODI) squad for their series against New Zealand. Later the same month, he was named in Pakistan's squad for the 2021 ICC Men's T20 World Cup. In December 2021, he was again named in Pakistan's ODI squad, this time for their series against the West Indies.

In February 2022, Wasim was added to Pakistan's Test squad for the first match against Australia. The following month, Wasim was named in Pakistan's One Day International (ODI) squad, also for their series against Australia. He made his ODI debut on 29 March 2022, for Pakistan against Australia.

On 17 December 2022, he made his Test debut for the Pakistan cricket team against England in the third test.

References

External links
 

2001 births
Living people
Pakistani cricketers
Pakistan One Day International cricketers
Pakistan Twenty20 International cricketers
Islamabad United cricketers
Khyber Pakhtunkhwa cricketers
People from North Waziristan